Altrincham Interchange is a transport hub in Altrincham, Greater Manchester, England. It consists of a bus station on Stamford New Road, a Northern Trains-operated heavy rail station on the Mid-Cheshire Line, and a light rail stop which forms the terminus of Manchester Metrolink's Altrincham line. The original heavy rail element of the station was opened by the Manchester, South Junction and Altrincham Railway as Altrincham and Bowdon railway station in April 1881, changing to Altrincham railway station in May 1974. The Metrolink element opened in June 1992. The Interchange underwent a complete redevelopment, at a cost of £19 million, starting in mid-July 2013. The new bus station opened officially on 7 December 2014.

History

The station was opened on 3 April 1881 as Altrincham & Bowdon by the Manchester, South Junction and Altrincham Railway (MSJAR) to replace Altrincham (1st) railway station on Stockport Road and Bowdon station on Lloyd Street/Railway Street which both closed that day. All platforms were through, with Nos. 1 and 2 (nearest to the town) being used by the MSJAR.

The Cheshire Lines Committee (CLC) trains from Manchester Central to Northwich and Chester Northgate used platforms 3 and 4. The CLC also operated a service from  via  to Altrincham, latterly using Sentinel steam railcars, but this service ceased in late 1939.

The station became part of the London, Midland and Scottish Railway during the Grouping of 1923. The station then passed on to the London Midland Region of British Railways on nationalisation in 1948.

Since 6 May 1974, the station has been named Altrincham. In 1975 a new booking office was opened on platform 4 to serve the car park on the site of the former goods yard. Also in 1975, work began to convert the former station forecourt on Stamford New Road into a bus station, and the Victorian glass-covered canopy over the station entrance was demolished. The new combined Altrincham Interchange bus/rail station was opened in November 1976.

When Sectorisation was introduced in the 1980s, the station was served by Regional Railways under arrangement with the Greater Manchester Passenger Transport Executive until the privatisation of British Rail.

Regional Railways electric trains between Manchester and Altrincham ceased serving the station on 24 December 1991. The former electric train platforms (1 and 2) reopened for use by Metrolink on 15 June 1992.

A new roof for platform 1 costing £180,000 was installed in 2006. This platform had been uncovered since glazed panels were removed in 2003 due to safety concerns. The new roof is made of coated steel with clear panels to let in the light.

The station clock tower on Stamford New Road, erected in 1880, is a Grade II listed structure.

Redevelopment
The Interchange was redeveloped in 2013-15 by Laing O'Rourke. The project was partly funded by the Local Sustainable Transport Fund.

The interchange reopened on 7 December 2014, integrating Bus, Rail and Metrolink services again, although the lifts and some roofing in the railway station was not completed until 2015.

Services

Altrincham Interchange has four rail platforms. Two bay platforms are used for Metrolink services.

Rail
The through service to  ceased to run from 15 December 2008.

Through passengers had to use the Metrolink service to continue their journey (connections were advertised in the 2007-8 timetable and National Rail tickets were valid for through trips). From December 2008 however, the service frequency has been improved (to two-hourly each way) and through running to  &  reinstated for the first time since the early nineties.

Metrolink

There is a frequent Metrolink service to Manchester and Bury, with a tram every six minutes to Manchester for most of the day (alternate trams running to Bury, avoiding Piccadilly). Monday-Saturday evening and Sunday journeys run every 12 minutes to Piccadilly, with journeys to Bury requiring a change of trams at Piccadilly Gardens.

Altrincham is in Metrolink fare zone 4.

Service pattern
5 trams per hour to Piccadilly via Sale
5 trams per hour to Bury (peak only)
1 train per hour to Piccadilly via Stockport
1 train per hour to Chester

Bus services
The former station forecourt now serves as a Transport for Greater Manchester bus station, providing interchange with local bus services to locations within Trafford. Buses also operate to Stockport, Wythenshawe, Macclesfield, The Trafford Centre, Sale, Hale, Timperley, East Didsbury, Manchester Airport, Bowdon and Warrington. The main bus operator is Arriva North West but other significant operators include Stagecoach Manchester, Warrington's Own Buses, Warrington Coachways and Vale Travel.

There is also a taxi rank.

References

Further reading

External links

 Metrolink Times and Stop Information
 Altrincham Metrolink area map
 Bus information for Altrincham Interchange from Transport for Greater Manchester
  Mid-Cheshire Community Rail Partnership
 Altrincham Interchange updates

Railway stations in Trafford
DfT Category C2 stations
Tram stops in Trafford
Former Manchester, South Junction and Altrincham Railway stations
Railway stations in Great Britain opened in 1881
Railway stations in Great Britain closed in 1991
Railway stations in Great Britain opened in 1992
Northern franchise railway stations
Tram stops on the Altrincham to Bury line
Tram stops on the Altrincham to Piccadilly line
Bus stations in Greater Manchester
Altrincham
1881 establishments in England